is a manga series by Kon Kimura. It was adapted into a television special and a film in 2015.

Characters
Katsura Tatsuki (Izumi Fujimoto)
Yōji Hinata (Eiji Sugawara)
Hiroko Izumi (Arisa Urahama)
Kōta (Misato Tanaka)

References

External links

2015 television specials
Japanese television specials
Kodansha manga
Live-action films based on manga
Manga adapted into films
Seinen manga
Japanese drama films